Yvonne Evelyn Hughes (1900 - December 26, 1950) was a dancer in the Ziegfeld Follies and an actress in silent motion pictures.

Biography

Career and personal life
Hughes appeared in films with Gloria Swanson and once danced with Rudolph Valentino. Her movie appearances came in 1923 and 1924. She had roles in Lawful Larceny, Zaza, Big Brother, A Society Scandal, and Monsieur Beaucaire. She also appeared in Rio Rita, and Whoopi! 1928-1929, a musical 
comedy.
She was married to Charles Alvin Hamilton Feick October 20, 1917 in Wellsburg, West Virginia, USA and divorced him on Nov 6 1920, they had a son Charles A “Papa” Feick, Jr born May 30, 1918 in McKeesport, PA & died November 8, 1988 in the state of Maryland . 
In 1928, Hughes married Gordon Godowsky, son of Leopold Godowsky. The marriage lasted one year. In 1932, Godowsky committed suicide over financial trouble.

Murder
On December 26, 1950, Hughes was murdered in the New York City hotel room of Birger Nordkvist, a Swedish apple picker who worked for a western New York cider firm. Earlier that night, Nordkvist got into a cab driven by John McDonald, who had lived with Hughes for fourteen years. McDonald offered to take him to the Ashland Hotel, where he kept a room. Nordkvist met Hughes, who demonstrated some old dance routines for him, and they drank beer through the night and into the next morning; all the while, McDonald was driving his taxi. After Hughes rebuffed Nordkvist's advances, Nordkvist strangled her by tying his handkerchief around her throat and stuffing a silk scarf into her mouth. Nordkvist was arrested in Utica, New York where he went after leaving the hotel.

Selected filmography
Zaza (1923)
Lawful Larceny (1923)
A Society Scandal (1924)
Monsieur Beaucaire (1924)

References
New York Times, "Apple Picker Held For Hotel Killing", December 29, 1950, Page 12.
Pasco, Washington Tri-City Herald, "Question Apple Picker After Aging Follies Beauty Found Strangled", December 27, 1950, Page 2.
San Mateo, California Times, "Ziegfeld Girl Strangled", December 26, 1950, Page 2.

External links
 
 

1900 births
1950 deaths
American film actresses
American silent film actresses
American stage actresses
Ziegfeld girls
People from McKeesport, Pennsylvania
Date of birth unknown
20th-century American actresses